is an upcoming original Japanese anime television series created by Jun Inagawa and animated by Bibury Animation Studios. It is directed by Hiroshi Ikehata, with Masao Kawase serving as assistant director, Daishiro Tanimura writing the scripts, Yuki Sawa designing the characters, and Gin Hashiba composing the music. The series is set to premiere on April 8, 2023, on the Animeism programming block on MBS and other channels. The opening theme song is "Magical Destroyer" by Aimi, while the ending theme song is "Gospelion in a classic love" by The 13th tailor.

Characters

Shobon

References

External links
 Anime official website 
 

2023 anime television series debuts
Anime with original screenplays
Animeism
Bibury Animation Studios
Magical girl anime and manga
Upcoming anime television series